Carl Fabian Emanuel Björling (30 November 1839 – 6 May 1910) was a Swedish mathematician and meteorologist.

Life 
He was born on 30 November 1839 in Västerås, Sweden, and died on 6 May 1910. He was the son of mathematician Emanuel Björling and father of lawyer Carl Georg Björling.

Career 
He attained his Ph.D. from Uppsala University in 1863. In 1863, he became an associate professor of mathematics at Uppsala University. In 1867 he was appointed a lecturer of mathematics and physics at the Halmstad grammar school.

From 1873 to 1904 he was the professor of mathematics at Lund University. In 1886, he became a member of the Royal Swedish Academy of Sciences.

References

External links 
 
 Author profile in the database zbMATH

1839 births
1910 deaths
Swedish mathematicians
Swedish meteorologists
People from Västerås
Uppsala University alumni
Academic staff of Uppsala University
Academic staff of Lund University
Members of the Royal Swedish Academy of Sciences